Bratsky is a rural locality (a khutor) in Krepinskoye Rural Settlement, Kalachyovsky District, Volgograd Oblast, Russia. The population was 312 as of 2010. There are 4 streets.

Geography 
Bratsky is located 68 km south of Kalach-na-Donu (the district's administrative centre) by road. Beloglinsky is the nearest rural locality.

References 

Rural localities in Kalachyovsky District